Rahimabad is a hill station in Nagar district, Gilgit-Baltistan, Pakistan.  It is known for its scenic beauty and is situated along the Hunza River.

References 

Hill stations in Pakistan
Populated places in Nagar District